The Treaty of Brussels, also referred to as the Brussels Pact, was the founding treaty of the Western Union (WU) between 1948 and 1954, when it was amended as the Modified Brussels Treaty (MTB) and served as the founding treaty of the Western European Union (WEU) until its termination in 2010. The treaty provided for the organisation of military, economic, social and cultural cooperation among member states as well as a mutual defence clause.

The treaty was signed on 17 March 1948 by Belgium, France, Luxembourg, the Netherlands and the United Kingdom, the members of the Western Union, as an expansion to the Treaty of Dunkirk, which had been signed between Britain and France the previous year to guard against possible German or Soviet aggression after the end of World War II.

The need to back up the commitments of the North Atlantic Treaty with appropriate political and military structures led to the creation of the North Atlantic Treaty Organization (NATO). In December 1950, the parties to the Treaty of Brussels decided to transfer the headquarters, personnel and plans of the Western Union Defence Organisation (WUDO) to NATO, whose Supreme Headquarters Allied Powers Europe (SHAPE) took over responsibility for the defence of Western Europe.

The establishment of NATO, along with the signing of a succession of treaties establishing the Organisation for European Economic Cooperation (April 1948), the Council of Europe (May 1949) and the European Coal and Steel Community (April 1951), left the Treaty of Brussels and its Western Union devoid of authority.

The treaty was amended at the 1954 Paris Conference as a result of the failure of the Treaty establishing the European Defence Community to gain French ratification: The General Treaty of 1952 formally named the EDC as a prerequisite of the end of Allied occupation of Germany, and there was a desire to include Germany in the Western defence architecture. The Modified Brussels Treaty (MBT) transformed the Western Union into the Western European Union (WEU), at which point Italy and Germany were admitted. Although the WEU that was established by the Modified Brussels Treaty was significantly less powerful and ambitious than the original Western Union, German membership of the WEU was considered sufficient for the occupation of the country to end in accordance with the General Treaty.

When the European Union (EU) gained its own mutual defence clause upon the entry into force of the Treaty of Lisbon in 2009, the members of the WEU, which were also EU member states, regarded the WEU as redundant. Consequently, the Modified Treaty of Brussels was terminated on 31 March 2010, followed by the closure of WEU bodies on 30 June 2011.

Contents

The treaty provided for the organisation of military, economic, social and cultural cooperation among member states.

The Treaty of Brussels contained a mutual defence clause (Article IV in the original treaty and Article V in the Modified Brussels Treaty).

History

Background

Timeline 
22 January 1948: British foreign minister Ernest Bevin announces that the United Kingdom will propose, in agreement with their French colleagues, the drafting of a treaty that expands the 1947 Treaty of Dunkirk to also include the Benelux countries.
31 January 1948: Benelux foreign ministers declare that their countries agree to begin these talks.
19 February 1948: France and the United Kingdom submit a draft treaty to the Benelux states.
4 March 1948: A conference is held in Brussels between the five foreign ministers, from which point the proposal is elaborated, and on 12 March transmitted to the respective governments.

Motivation
The treaty was intended to provide Western Europe with a bulwark against the communist threat and to bring greater collective security. There were cultural and social clauses and concepts for the setting up of a 'Consultative Council'. Co-operation between Western nations was believed to help stop the spread of Communism.

Signing

The Treaty was signed on 17 March 1948 by the following plenipotentiaries:
 Prince Charles of Belgium, as the reigning prince regent of Belgium
 Vincent Auriol, President of France 
 Charlotte, Grand Duchess of Luxembourg
 Queen Wilhelmina of the Netherlands
 King George VI of the United Kingdom
 Paul-Henri Spaak, Prime Minister of Belgium
 Georges Bidault, French Minister of Foreign Affairs
 Joseph Bech, Luxembourgish Minister of Foreign Affairs
 Gaston Eyskens, Belgian Minister of Finance
 Carel Godfried Willem Hendrik baron van Boetzelaer van Oosterhout, Dutch Minister of Foreign Affairs
 Ernest Bevin, Secretary of State for Foreign Affairs of the United Kingdom
 Jean de Hautecloque, Ambassador Extraordinary and Plenipotentiary of the French Republic in Brussels
 Robert Als, Envoy Extraordinary and Minister Plenipotentiary of Luxembourg in Brussels
 Baron Binnert Philip van Harinxma thoe Slooten, Ambassador Extraordinary and Plenipotentiary of the Netherlands in Brussels
 George William Rendel, Ambassador Extraordinary and Plenipotentiary of His Britannic Majesty in Brussels

Ratification and entry into force
Dates of deposit of the instruments of ratification of the treaty:
Belgium: 3 April 1948
United Kingdom: 2 June 1948
Luxembourg: 10 June 1948
Netherlands: 20 July 1948
France: 25 August 1948, at which point the treaty entered into force

Implementation
In September 1948, the parties to the Treaty of Brussels decided to create a military agency under the name of the Western Union Defence Organization. It consisted of a WU Defence Committee at Prime Ministerial level, and a WU Combined Chiefs of Staff committee, including all the national chiefs of staff, which would direct the operative organisation.

Field Marshal Bernard Montgomery (UK) was appointed permanent Chairman of the Land, Naval and Air Commanders-in-Committee, with headquarters in Fontainebleau, France. The nominated commanders-in-chief were General Jean de Lattre de Tassigny (France) as C-in-C, Land Forces, Air Chief Marshal Sir James Robb (UK) as C-in-C, Air Forces, and Vice-Admiral Robert Jaujard (France) for the Navy, as Flag Officer Western Europe. Volume 3 of Nigel Hamilton's Life of Montgomery of Alamein gives a good account of the disagreements between Montgomery and de Lattre which caused much ill-feeling in the headquarters.

Cannibalisation and marginalisation
The treaty was left devoid of much of its authority after the signing of a succession of treaties establishing the Organisation for European Economic Cooperation (April 1948), the North Atlantic Treaty Organization (April 1949), the Council of Europe (May 1949) and the European Coal and Steel Community (April 1951). Responding to calls from the 1948 Congress of Europe for European cooperation on a wider front, the Consultative Council convened a Committee for the Study of European Unity, which met eight times from November 1948 to January 1949, formulating proposals for a new organisation that was to become the Council of Europe.

When the division of Europe into two opposing camps became considered unavoidable, the threat of the USSR became much more important than the threat of German rearmament. Western Europe, therefore, sought a new mutual defence pact involving the United States, a powerful military force for such an alliance. The United States, concerned with containing the influence of the USSR, was responsive. The need to back up the commitments of the North Atlantic Treaty with appropriate political and military structures led to the creation of the North Atlantic Treaty Organization (NATO). In December 1950, with the appointment of General Eisenhower as the first Supreme Allied Commander Europe (SACEUR), the members of the Treaty of Brussels decided to merge the Western Union Defence Organisation (WUDO) into NATO. NATO's Supreme Headquarters Allied Powers Europe (SHAPE) took over the WUDO's defence role.

As an effort towards European postwar security co-operation, the treaty was a precursor to NATO in that it promised European mutual defence. However, it greatly differed from NATO in that it envisaged a purely-European mutual defence pact primarily against Germany. When NATO took shape the next year, on the other hand, it was recognised that Europe was being unavoidably divided into two opposing blocks (western and communist), and the USSR was a much greater threat than the possibility of a resurgent Germany, and Western European mutual defence would have to be Atlanticist and so include North America.

Trying to avoid the need for West German rearmament, a treaty aimed at establishing a European Defence Community was signed by the six ECSC members in May 1952 but failed when it was rejected by the French National Assembly in August 1954. This rejection led to the London and Paris Conferences in September and October, with the result that the Treaty of Brussels was amended by the Protocol signed in Paris on 23 October 1954, which added West Germany and Italy to the Western Union Defence Organization (WUDO). At this time, the WUDO was renamed the Western European Union, and the Treaty was renamed the Modified Brussels Treaty.

Modification

On 23 October 1954, as a result of the rejection of the Treaty establishing the European Defence Community by the French parliament and the following London and Paris Conferences, the Treaty of Brussels was amended as the Modified Brussels Treaty. This transformed the Western Union into the Western European Union and admitted West Germany and Italy. Social and cultural aspects were handed to the Council of Europe to avoid duplication of responsibilities within Europe.

Termination
In 2009, Article 42.7 of the Treaty of Lisbon effectively replaced Article V of the Modified Brussels Treaty as the mutual defence clause for EU member states who were also WEU allies. After discussions, the ten WEU member states decided to terminate the Treaty of Brussels on 31 March 2010. The activities of WEU were formally terminated in June 2011.

See also

Treaty of Dunkirk
Western Union
London and Paris Conferences
Western European Union
NATO
Treaty establishing the European Defence Community
Common Security and Defence Policy

References

External links
 European Navigator The Treaty of Brussels 1948
 Modified Brussels Treaty, 23 October 1954  The Modified Brussels Treaty 1954
 History until the creation of the WEU 
 Brussels Pact

Western Union (alliance)
Western European Union
1948 in Belgium
1948 in France
1948 in the Netherlands
1948 in the United Kingdom
1948 in Luxembourg
Treaties concluded in 1948
Treaties entered into force in 1948
20th-century military alliances
Brussels 1948
Brussels 1948
Brussels 1948
March 1948 events in Europe
1940s in Brussels
Brussels
Brussels 1948
Events in Brussels